The Rio Grande do Sul gubernatorial election was held on 5 October 2014 to elect the next governor of the state of Rio Grande do Sul.  Since no candidate received more than 50% of the vote in the first round, a second-round runoff election was held on 26 October.

Incumbent governor Tarso Genro was running for a second term, a distinction not achieved in recent history.  His main challengers were Senator Ana Amélia Lemos of the Progressive Party and former Mayor of Caxias do Sul José Ivo Sartori of the Brazilian Democratic Movement Party.

Opinion polls leading up to the first round had shown Genro with a comfortable lead over his primary rival Lemos and Sartori steadily gaining support.  Eventually, it was Sartori who defied opinion polls and ended comfortably in first place. Genro finished in second to advance to the runoff while Lemos finished in a distant third.

In the second round, Sartori defeated Genro with over 60% of the vote and was elected for a four-year term as governor.

Candidates

Coalitions

Opinion Polling

Results

References

October 2014 events in South America
2014 Brazilian gubernatorial elections
Rio Grande do Sul gubernatorial elections